James Gilmour Wilson (19 November 1890 – 15 December 1917) was a Scottish amateur footballer who played as a left back in the Scottish League for Queen's Park.

Personal life 
Wilson attended Kilwinning Higher Grade School and Irvine Royal Academy and later worked as an accountant in Charing Cross. In September 1915, just over a year after Britain's entry into the First World War, Wilson enlisted in the Argyll and Sutherland Highlanders. He transferred to the Black Watch in September 1915 and saw action with the battalion on the Somme. In 1917, Wilson was commissioned as a second lieutenant in the Royal Scots Fusiliers and was killed by a sniper in Flanders on 15 December 1917. He is commemorated on the Menin Gate.

Career statistics

References 

Scottish footballers
1917 deaths
British Army personnel of World War I
British military personnel killed in World War I
Royal Scots Fusiliers officers
Scottish Football League players
Kilwinning Rangers F.C. players
People from Kilwinning
Association football fullbacks
People educated at Irvine Royal Academy
Scottish accountants
Argyll and Sutherland Highlanders soldiers
Black Watch soldiers
1890 births
Scottish Junior Football Association players
Deaths by firearm in Belgium
20th-century Scottish businesspeople